Żółwiniec may refer to the following places:
Żółwiniec, Gmina Ślesin in Greater Poland Voivodeship (west-central Poland)
Żółwiniec, Gmina Wierzbinek in Greater Poland Voivodeship (west-central Poland)
Żółwiniec, Kuyavian-Pomeranian Voivodeship (north-central Poland)
Żółwiniec, Warmian-Masurian Voivodeship (north Poland)